Vincent Frank Testaverde Sr. (born November 13, 1963) is an American former professional football player who was a quarterback in the National Football League (NFL) for 21 seasons. He played college football for the Miami Hurricanes, where he was an All-American and won the Heisman Trophy in 1986.

Testaverde was drafted first overall by the Tampa Bay Buccaneers in the 1987 NFL Draft. After leaving as a free agent, he signed with the Cleveland Browns and was among the personnel transferred to the newly created Baltimore Ravens during a controversial relocation of the team. He then joined the New York Jets, where he achieved his greatest success. In the last four seasons of his career, he played for the Dallas Cowboys, the Jets for a second time, New England Patriots, and Carolina Panthers for one year each.

Testaverde's professional career was principally characterized by its longevity, lasting 21 seasons, playing for seven different teams. Despite being in the top 10 upon retirement in most career passing statistics (6th in career passing yardage, 7th in career touchdown passes, 6th in career completions), his 123 losses as a starting quarterback is an NFL record, and his career regular-season winning percentage of 42.3% is the lowest of any quarterback with at least 70 wins. He played in five postseason games in his NFL career with a record of 2–3. Testaverde had a strong arm but had a tendency to commit turnovers.

Early years
Testaverde was born in Brooklyn, New York. While living in Elmont, New York, on Long Island, Testaverde went to school at Sewanhaka High School in Floral Park, and graduated in 1981. He then went to Fork Union Military Academy in Fork Union, Virginia for a post-graduate year of college preparatory work. Growing up, he was a fan of the Jets.

College career

Testaverde accepted an athletic scholarship to attend the University of Miami, where he played for the Miami Hurricanes football team from 1982 to 1986. He was red-shirted as a freshman, backed up Bernie Kosar for the next two seasons, and became the starter in 1985. As a senior in 1986, he was a consensus first-team All-American and won the Heisman Trophy, on his way to becoming the Hurricanes' all-time leader in career touchdown passes with 48. He played in the 1987 Fiesta Bowl against Penn State for the 1986 national championship, a game in which the Miami Hurricanes were heavily favored, but went on to lose 14–10 after Testaverde threw five interceptions. Testaverde played an important part in the University of Miami's history as one of the top collegiate football programs of the 1980s and 1990s. Along with Jim Kelly, Mark Richt, Bernie Kosar, Steve Walsh, Gino Torretta, Craig Erickson, and Ken Dorsey, Testaverde is considered part of the University of Miami's quarterback dynasty, and was inducted into the University of Miami Sports Hall of Fame in 1998. On May 7, 2013, he was inducted into the College Football Hall of Fame.

Statistics

Professional career

Tampa Bay Buccaneers
Testaverde was selected as the first overall draft pick by the Tampa Bay Buccaneers in the 1987 NFL Draft. In his second season, Testaverde struggled heavily, with a 47.6% completion rate for 3,240 yards, 13 touchdowns, and 35 interceptions. His 35 interceptions were the second most of any quarterback in a single season in NFL history. During his tenure in Tampa, Testaverde received taunts from fans and radio personalities about his color blindness. In 1988, a radio station in Tampa rented a billboard that had Testaverde standing in front of a blue background. The billboard read: "Vinny thinks this is orange!" The high number of errors caused his intelligence to be called into question. National Football League Players Association president Gene Upshaw, unaware that his comments could be heard by anyone viewing through a direct satellite uplink, once commented during an NFL Live! commercial break that Testaverde was so dumb that he would drag the electric cord through his swimming pool while trimming the hedges, and claimed himself to be a better quarterback (Upshaw was a retired offensive guard) than Testaverde. While Testaverde significantly reduced his interception total in 1989, he again led the league with 22. His numbers continued to improve, and in the 1992 season, his last with Tampa Bay, he threw for a 57.5% completion rate for 2,554 yards, 14 touchdowns, and 16 interceptions.

Cleveland Browns/Baltimore Ravens
Testaverde signed as an unrestricted free agent with the Cleveland Browns in 1993. After spending half a season as a backup to his former Hurricanes teammate Bernie Kosar, he became the starter after Kosar's release by then Browns head coach Bill Belichick. Testaverde spent three seasons in Cleveland, and in 1994 led the team into the playoffs, where they won the AFC wildcard game against New England before being defeated by Pittsburgh. After 1995, he moved with most of the Browns roster, coaches, and staff to Baltimore and played two seasons with the newly formed Baltimore Ravens. Testaverde scored the first touchdown in the history of the Ravens on a nine-yard run. He ended the season with over 4,000 yards passing, 33 touchdowns, and 19 interceptions. Testaverde made his first Pro Bowl appearance in 1996 with the Ravens.

Said football statistics site Football Outsiders of Testaverde's unlikely 1996 season, "The real reason the Ravens ranked first in rushing [efficiency] was, believe it or not, Vinny Testaverde, who was out of his gourd as a scrambler that season. Ignore the official stats and take out the kneels, and Testaverde had 197 yards on just 23 carries, 8.6 yards per carry. He scrambled seven times on third down with 5-10 yards to go and converted six of those. He scrambled six times on a 1st-and-10 and gained a new first down five times. Testaverde had not rushed for 100 yards since 1992."

Testaverde signed a restructured four-year contract with the Ravens ahead of the 1997 season. Ravens owner Art Modell complemented Testaverde on his loyalty to the team and his acceptance of the city of Baltimore. However, Testaverde did not perform as well in 1997 as he did the previous year. He threw 18 touchdowns and 15 interceptions, and was replaced by backup Eric Zeier after suffering an injury. Zeier led the Ravens to two consecutive victories and become popular with the fans. After trading for Indianapolis Colts quarterback Jim Harbaugh, the Ravens released Testaverde prior to the 1998 season. While Modell and Ravens coach Ted Marchibroda complimented Testaverde and said that he would start elsewhere in the NFL, Testaverde and his agent were dissatisfied with the way that his release was conducted.

New York Jets
In 1998, his first season with his hometown New York Jets, Testaverde flourished, completing 61.5% of his passes with 29 touchdowns, seven interceptions, and a 101.6 quarterback rating, making the Pro Bowl for the second time.

In a December game against the Seattle Seahawks, Testaverde was involved in a play that was cited as an impetus for the NFL's adoption of a new instant replay review system the next season. With the Jets trailing 31–26 and twenty seconds left in the game, Testaverde attempted to score on a quarterback sneak on fourth and goal from the Seattle five-yard line. Testaverde had been tackled and the ball was not across the goal line when this happened, but because Testaverde's helmet had crossed the line the game's head linesman, Earnie Frantz, ruled the play a touchdown. The Jets won the game 32–31 and the loss was said to have cost the Seahawks a playoff berth and coach Dennis Erickson his job. The game's referee, Phil Luckett, drew criticism for the call although he was not the one who made it.

In spite of the controversy, Testaverde's 1998 season was arguably his best season in the NFL. With him under center, the Jets won the AFC East for the first time since the merger and earned a first-round bye and a home playoff game. In the AFC Championship Game that year, they lost to the eventual Super Bowl champion Denver Broncos.

The Jets had Super Bowl aspirations entering the 1999 season. However, in the first game of the season, against the New England Patriots, Testaverde suffered a ruptured Achilles tendon and did not play the rest of the season.

In 2000, however, Testaverde returned to quarterback the Jets. The highlight of the season was the "Monday Night Miracle" game against the Miami Dolphins on October 23, 2000, selected by fans as the greatest game in Monday Night Football history. In that game, the Jets fell behind 30–7 going into the fourth quarter, but came back to win the game, 40–37 behind five touchdown passes from Testaverde, including one each to Laveranues Coles, Jermaine Wiggins, Jumbo Elliott, and two to Wayne Chrebet.

In 2001, Testaverde led the Jets back to the playoffs, where they lost in the first round to the Oakland Raiders. In 2002, he was replaced after a 1–3 start by Chad Pennington. He made cameo appearances to take the last snap in both the playoff-clinching game versus the Green Bay Packers and the 41–0 playoff win against the Indianapolis Colts.  In 2003, he was assigned to a backup role behind Pennington, although he started the first six games due to Pennington's left wrist injury.

Dallas Cowboys
Despite his injuries, Testaverde's performance with the Jets endeared him to head coach Bill Parcells, who retired from coaching in 1999. One year after Parcells was lured out of retirement by Dallas Cowboys owner Jerry Jones, he brought Testaverde to the Cowboys in 2004.

Testaverde initially was signed to be a backup and mentor to young Cowboys quarterback Quincy Carter, but after Carter was abruptly cut by the Cowboys for allegedly failing a drug test, Testaverde was given the starting quarterback job. While many questioned his ability to still play in the NFL, the protection schemes and play-calling allowed him to showcase his arm, although with mixed results. He was able to throw for significant yardage, but led the league in interceptions, getting picked off on 4% of his passes. Dallas finished the 2004 season 6-10, tied for third and last place in the NFC East division.

Testaverde's one-year contract with the Cowboys expired early in 2005. The Cowboys chose to instead sign Parcells's 1993 number one draft pick, Drew Bledsoe, as their top quarterback, leaving Testaverde without a contract. Parcells cites Testaverde's presence in Dallas as having been important to the development of eventual starter Tony Romo. At the time, Testavere's 3,532 passing yards and 297 completions were the third-best total of his career and the third-most passing yards in Dallas Cowboys franchise history. He also tied the franchise record for 300-yard passing games in a season with three and became the fifth quarterback in league history to pass for over 300 yards at forty years of age.

Second stint with the New York Jets
As injuries on September 25, 2005, knocked both Chad Pennington and backup Jay Fiedler out for the 2005 season, the New York Jets re-signed Testaverde on September 27, 2005. Testaverde was named the Jets' starting quarterback in week five of the 2005 season, in a home game against the team that originally drafted him, the Tampa Bay Buccaneers.

On December 26, against the New England Patriots on the final ABC telecast of Monday Night Football, Testaverde set a new NFL record for most consecutive seasons with at least one touchdown pass, 19, by throwing a 27-yard pass to Laveranues Coles to secure the record. That pass is also notable as being the last touchdown pass thrown on Monday Night Football while it was still broadcast by ABC.  The game was also notable because the Patriots sent in back-up quarterback Doug Flutie, making this the first game in NFL history in which two quarterbacks over the age of 40 completed a pass (Testaverde was 42, Flutie was 43).

New England Patriots
On November 14, 2006, the New England Patriots signed Testaverde as a backup to starter Tom Brady (the only other quarterback on New England's roster at the time was Matt Cassel). Testaverde kneeled down for the final play in a victory against the Packers on November 19, 2006. Testaverde threw a touchdown pass to Troy Brown on December 31, 2006, against the Tennessee Titans, giving him at least one touchdown pass for the twentieth straight season, extending his NFL record. The Patriots defeated the Jets, Testaverde's former team, in the first round of the playoffs, and Testaverde took the last couple of snaps to run out the clock.

Testaverde wore #14 with the Patriots, the second time the number has been re-issued since Steve Grogan's retirement as P.K. Sam wore it earlier in the decade (since then the number has been used more frequently).

On May 29, 2007, Testaverde stated his interest in returning to the Patriots for the 2007 NFL season, and on July 13, 2007 confirmed this with Sporting News Radio. He officially signed a 1-year contract for $825,000 on August 18, 2007, but was released on September 1, 2007.

Carolina Panthers
With Jake Delhomme out for the 2007 season due to an elbow injury he suffered in a Week 3 victory over the Atlanta Falcons, and David Carr out with a sore back, the Panthers signed Testaverde on October 10, 2007. Testaverde, wearing #16, started his first game with the team on October 14, 2007, against the Arizona Cardinals. In that game he threw a 65-yard touchdown pass to Steve Smith, extending his NFL record to 21 consecutive seasons with a touchdown pass. After leading the Panthers to a 25–10 victory, the 43-year-old became the oldest starting quarterback to win a game in NFL history, and the third-oldest to start one. He has also thrown touchdown passes to 71 different players, a record since broken by Tom Brady. On Sunday, October 28, coach John Fox named Testaverde the starting quarterback against the Indianapolis Colts. In that game, Testaverde led the Panthers in the longest opening drive for a touchdown in franchise history, consisting of 18 plays and lasting for 11 minutes and one second. Despite winning time of possession in the first half of the game, the Panthers entered the locker room under a 3-point deficit. In the second half, Testaverde left the field with a strained Achilles tendon, and was replaced by former Houston Texans quarterback David Carr. Ultimately, the Panthers lost 31–7. Reports said that Testaverde would be out for at least a week.

On November 18, 2007, Testaverde and the Panthers played at Lambeau Field against Brett Favre and the Green Bay Packers for their Week 11 matchup. With Testaverde at 44 years of age and Favre at 38 years of age, this was the oldest starting quarterback duo in any game in NFL history. The "Senior Bowl", as it was nicknamed in the media, was won by the Packers 31–17.

On December 2, 2007, Testaverde became the second-oldest starting quarterback in NFL history at 44 years and 19 days old. He threw two touchdown passes against the San Francisco 49ers in the Panthers' win, breaking his own record for the oldest starter to win an NFL game. During this game, Testaverde and Dante Rosario became the passer/receiver duo with the largest age gap between them (20 years, 346 days) to connect for a touchdown.

Testaverde announced his plans for retirement on December 29, 2007, which would take effect after the final game of the season against the Tampa Bay Buccaneers on December 30.

Panthers head coach John Fox sent him into the game to take the final kneel-down snap in a game which the Panthers won 31–23 over the Tampa Bay Buccaneers, expectantly bringing to an end to the 44-year-old's 21-year NFL career at the same city he was originally drafted. By the start of 2008, he made it official by announcing his retirement from professional football in January. He, therefore, first became eligible for induction into the Pro Football Hall of Fame in 2013.

Legacy
Testaverde has thrown for more yards and touchdowns in the NFL than any other eligible quarterback who is not in the Hall of Fame. Despite his long career and overall statistical achievements, Testaverde only had moderate success in terms of wins and losses. During the regular season as a starter, he led his teams to 90 wins and 123 losses (with one tie). He led his team to the postseason on three occasions, with an overall postseason record of 2–3, reaching the AFC Championship Game once. A journeyman quarterback who played on seven different teams, Testaverde holds several NFL records related to his longevity in the league, including the NFL record for having thrown a touchdown pass in 21 consecutive seasons, the most losses by a starting quarterback with 123, and throwing touchdown passes to an NFL record 70 different players (broken by Tom Brady in 2018). He also had one of the highest completion percentages in a single game during the regular season (at least 20 attempts) at 91.3% (21/23), in 1993 against the Los Angeles Rams. Testaverde's one-time record has since been broken multiple times, with Drew Brees now holding the record at 96.7%.

As a player, Testaverde was commended for his arm strength but criticized for his lack of mobility and tendency to commit turnovers.

Career awards and highlights
 2× Pro Bowl (1996, 1998)
 PFW All-AFC (1998)
 2× AFC Passing Touchdowns Leader (1996, 1998)
 AFC Passer Rating Leader (1998)
 4× AFC Offensive Player of the Week (Week 17, 1993, Week 9, 1996, Week 7, 1998, Week 15, 2001)
 2× NFC Offensive Player of the Week (Week 1, 1989, Week 2, 1992)
 Tampa Bay Buccaneers all-time leader in pass completions (since broken by Jameis Winston), pass attempts (since broken by Jameis Winston), and interceptions.
 Inducted into the Florida Sports Hall of Fame (2006).
 Inducted into the College Football Hall of Fame (2013)
 Inducted into the Long Island Sports Hall of Fame (1987)

NFL career statistics

 In 1996, most of the players and personnel that made up the Cleveland Browns organization moved to Baltimore, establishing the Baltimore Ravens.

NFL records
 Most losses as a starting quarterback (123)
 2nd Most players throwing a touchdown pass to (70)
 Most players completing a pass to (134–138)

Buccaneers franchise records
Most times sacked (197)
 Most interceptions thrown in a season – 35 (1988)
 Most interceptions thrown in a career – 112 (1987–1992)

New York Jets franchise records
 Most 4th quarter comeback wins in a single season - 5 (2001)
 Most game winning drives in a single season - 5 (2001)

Personal life
Testaverde is currently the Quarterbacks Coach at Jesuit High School of Tampa, where his son Vincent Jr. attended. He and his wife, Mitzi, have two daughters, Alicia and Madeleine, and a son, Vincent Jr; they live in Tampa, Florida. Vincent Jr. played college football as a quarterback for the SUNY Albany Great Danes; he signed with the Tampa Bay Buccaneers as an undrafted free agent following the 2019 NFL draft and had a short stay with the Tampa Bay Vipers of the XFL.

See also
 List of NCAA major college football yearly passing leaders

References

External links
 
 
 

1963 births
Living people
All-American college football players
American Conference Pro Bowl players
American football quarterbacks
American people of Italian descent
Baltimore Ravens players
Carolina Panthers players
Cleveland Browns players
College Football Hall of Fame inductees
Dallas Cowboys players
Ed Block Courage Award recipients
Heisman Trophy winners
Maxwell Award winners
Miami Hurricanes football players
National Football League first-overall draft picks
New England Patriots players
New York Jets players
People from Elmont, New York
People from Floral Park, New York
Players of American football from New York (state)
Players of American football from New York City
Players of American football from Tampa, Florida
Sportspeople from Brooklyn
Tampa Bay Buccaneers players